.cd is the Internet country code top-level domain (ccTLD) for the Democratic Republic of the Congo. It was created in 1997 as a replacement for the .zr (Zaire) ccTLD, which was phased out and eventually deleted in 2001.

Except for reserved names like .com.cd, .net.cd, .org.cd and others, any person in the world can register a .cd domain for a fee. The ccTLD is popular (and thus economically valuable) owing to it being an abbreviation for compact disc (other similar ccTLDs are .fm, .am, .tv, .dj, .mu, and .me). Such unconventional uses of TLDs in domain names are known as domain hacks.

.zr
.zr is the former Internet country code top-level domain (ccTLD) for Zaire.  When Zaire was renamed to Democratic Republic of the Congo in 1997, .zr was phased out and .cd took its place.  In 2001, .zr was deleted.

References

External links 
IANA whois information for .cd
 Official home page of Congo Internet Management
IANA redelegation report on .cd ccTLD (2011)
IANA report on deletion 

Communications in the Democratic Republic of the Congo
Country code top-level domains

sv:Toppdomän#C